This is a list of adult nonfiction books that topped The New York Times Nonfiction Best Seller list in 1999.

See also

New York Times Fiction Best Sellers of 1999
 1999 in literature
 Lists of The New York Times Fiction Best Sellers
 Lists of The New York Times Nonfiction Best Sellers
 Publishers Weekly list of bestselling novels in the United States in the 1990s

References

1999

1999 in the United States